Yellow River flood
 1034 Yellow River flood
 1048 Yellow River flood
 1344 Yellow River flood
 1887 Yellow River flood
 1931 Yellow River flood
1938 Yellow River flood